Ivona or Ивoна is a Slavic variant of the female given name Yvonne. It is the name of:

Ivona Bogoje (born 1976), Croatian female basketball player
Ivona Brandić (born 1977), Bosnian-Austrian computer scientist
Ivona Březinová (born 1964), Czech writer
Ivona Dadić (born 1993), Bosnian-Austrian track and field athlete
Ivona Fialková (born 1994), Slovak biathlete
Ivona Horvat (born 1973), Croatian tennis player
Ivona Jerković (born 1984), Serbian women's basketball player
Ivona Juka, Croatian and Montenegrin film director
Ivona Matić (born 1986), Croatian female basketball player
Ivona Pavićević (born 1996), Montenegrin handball player

See also
Amazon Echo, which uses voice recognition technology from Polish firm Ivona